Phukha is a Loloish language spoken by the Phula people of Vietnam and China.

Distribution
Phukha is spoken near Lao Cai town; Xin Mun District of Ha Giang Province and Lai Chau and Son La Provinces in Vietnam and villages in Maguan, Malipo and Hekou Counties in China. Phula people in Yen Bai Province do not speak Phukha but speak Laghuu.

Phonology

Consonants 
Phukha has the following consonants.

Vowels 
Phukha has the following vowels.

Tones 

Notes

References 
Robert Wayne Fried.  2000.  "A Preliminary Phonological Sketch of Phu-kha, a Tibeto-Burman Language Spoken in Northern Vietnam," University of Texas at Arlington MA thesis.
Jamin R. Pelkey.  2005.  "Puzzling over Phula:  Toward the Synthesis and Statement of a Sub-Branch," Linguistics of the Tibeto-Burman Area 28/2:41-78.

Loloish languages